My Dear Boy is a 2017 Taiwanese television series produced by Ruby Lin and Lisa Tan (Lin's agent) written by Mag Hsu and directed by Hsu Fu-chun. It premiered on TTV and GTV in December 2017.

Synopsis
It takes a tremendous amount of courage to make changes to your personal and professional lives. Luo Xiao Fei (Ruby Lin) works as a director of television commercials. Her boss is Xiao Ye Shi (Archie Kao), the owner of the advertising agency as well as her boyfriend of five years. Despite the complacency and neglect of her long-term relationship with Ye Shi, Xiao Fei finds it hard to make major changes in her life that could impact her job.
When Xiao Fei meets the much younger An Qing Hui (Derek Chang), who just graduated from college with a design degree, will he give Xiao Fei the courage to follow her heart?

Cast

Main cast
 Ruby Lin as Luo Xiao Fei
 Derek Chang as An Qing Hui
 Archie Kao as Xiao Ye Shi
 Lee Lee-zen as Xiao Lai

Supporting cast
 Wen Chen-ling as Pan Yan Ting
 Cheryl Yang as Mei Shuang
 Jessie Chang as Luo Xiao Shan
 Easton Dong (Dong Ming-Hsian or Tung Ming-Hsiang) as Xiao Fei's Brother-in-Law, Cheng-Cheng (政誠)
 Elsa Ge as Xiao Nian Shi
 Qu Zhong Heng as An Qing Hui's Father
 Yen Yi-Wen as An Qing Hui's Mother
 Greg Hsu as Nicholai
 Zhang Guang Chen as Gao Pi
 Aaron Chan as An Qing Hui's Uncle
 Pang Yong Zhi as Li Da Bao
 Peter Lee as Zhang Wei Jie 
 Ahn Zhe as Miaomiao
 Cosmos Lin as Amy

Guest appearance
 Hsieh Chiung-hsuan
 Melody (Yin Yue)
 Heaven Hai as Wei-wei
 Hsu Wei-ning
 Melvin Sia

Production
A press conference for the series was held in Taipei, Taiwan, on 31 May 2017. Filming ended on 19 October 2017.

Soundtrack

Ratings

References

External links
Official site at TTV 
Official site at GTV 
Official Facebook 
 

Taiwanese romance television series
Taiwanese drama television series
2017 Taiwanese television series debuts
2018 Taiwanese television series endings
Taiwan Television original programming
Gala Television original programming
Television shows written by Mag Hsu